Streptomyces corchorusii is a bacterium species from the genus of Streptomyces which has been isolated from soil. Streptomyces corchorusii produces butalactin.

Further reading

See also 
 List of Streptomyces species

References

External links
Type strain of Streptomyces corchorusii at BacDive -  the Bacterial Diversity Metadatabase

corchorusii
Bacteria described in 1958